Silvestar Bubanović, O.S.B.M. (13 October 1754 – 14 June 1810) was a Greek Catholic hierarch. He was the bishop from 1795 to 1810 of the Eastern Catholic Eparchy of Križevci.

Born in Grabarak, Habsburg monarchy  (present day – Croatia) in 1754, he was ordained a priest on 19 March 1778 as member of the Order of Saint Basil the Great. Fr. Bubanović was the Rector of the Greek Catholic Seminary in Zagreb from 1779 to 1780.

He was confirmed as the Bishop by the Holy See on 22 September 1795. He was consecrated to the Episcopate on 8 November 1795. The principal consecrator was Bishop Andriy Bachynskyi.

He died in Križevci on 14 June 1810.

References 

1754 births
1810 deaths
18th-century Eastern Catholic bishops
19th-century Eastern Catholic bishops
Croatian Eastern Catholics
Greek Catholic Church of Croatia and Serbia
Order of Saint Basil the Great